Druuna is an erotic science fiction and fantasy comic book character created by Italian cartoonist Paolo Eleuteri Serpieri. Most of Druuna's adventures revolve around a post-apocalyptic future, and the plot is often a vehicle for varied scenes of hardcore pornography and softcore sexual imagery. Druuna is frequently depicted as sparsely clothed or nude, and Serpieri's high quality renditions of her are often reproduced as poster prints.

Druuna starred in nine volumes of the Morbus Gravis (Severe Disease) series between 1985 and 2018. These stories were featured prominently in Métal hurlant and Heavy Metal magazines. Druuna has also been featured in Serpieri's numerous and popular sketchbooks, which have sold more than a million copies in twelve languages. Serpieri himself appears in many of the stories as the character Doc.

Morbus Gravis

Plot 
During the more than thirty years of publication of Druuna's adventures in Morbus Gravis, the plot has evolved through several stages, differentiated with numerous jumps in the storyline, with some attendant inconsistencies.

In the first volumes in the series, the action unfolds in a place called The City, a futuristic but degraded urban environment. Humans live in a cramped, hostile, and decadent society, controlled by a religious oligarchy based on the knowledge of "Truth." In this society, books are banned and power is exercised by a corrupt and despotic militarized bureaucracy.

Although never clearly stated, this current era, known as the "Age of Man", is presumed to be the aftermath of a war. As told by the priests, an incurable, infectious disease called Evil has spread among the population that transforms people in a progressive and rapid fashion into amorphous, tentacled mutants. As a precautionary measure, all of the City's inhabitants are forcibly injected with a serum periodically distributed in overcrowded health facilities. Many believe that those found to be "healthy" will be sent to the City's upper levels, a place inaccessible to the majority but where those selected enjoy a better life free from want and hardship. Similarly, those infected with "Evil" are sent to the lower levels. Druuna and her lover Shastar exist in this environment.

After a series of adventures, Druuna discovers that the City is actually a giant spaceship which left Earth after an unspecified cataclysm and has drifted through space for centuries. At some point, Lewis, the ship's captain, delegated control to the computer Delta, which is responsible for creating the current state of affairs. (The Priests are actually androids operated by Delta.) Delta transformed Lewis into an immortal being, using organic parts from the healthy people who had been admitted to the upper levels of the City. Now, Lewis, tired of immortality, wants to die, which would eliminate Delta and destroy the City. This conflict is partially responsible for the gradual degradation of life on the ship/planetoid.

Druuna is recruited by Lewis to help him destroy Delta. Unaware of fact that it would mean destruction of the City and all its inhabitants, Druuna finds Delta and carries out Lewis's plan. At the end Lewis reveals his true plan to destroy the City, but also confesses he fell in love with her and changes his mind about destruction. In turn, Lewis puts Druuna in a state similar to hibernation for centuries, waiting for an opportunity to improve conditions on the City. The story then introduces a man named Will, who commands another ship, similar to the City, which has become, thanks to the evolution of Evil, a super-organism. It is revealed that apart from the City, humanity is not entirely extinguished, but that other groups of humans survived, using genetic engineering to improve their abilities.

Embarking on Commander Will's spacecraft, Druuna discovers that the minds of Shastar and Lewis have been merged and transferred to the new ship's computer. The disease called Evil appears among the new ship's crew, so Will and Doc (author Serpieri's alter-ego) telepathically introduce Druuna into the mind of Lewis-Shastar, discovering the elements that make up the antidote serum. When Druuna gets trapped in the computer mind, Will enters it to rescue her. Discovering that they actually have no means to develop a cure for the disease, they decide to destroy the ship and crew (as well as the computer that houses the merged minds of Shastar and Lewis). Druuna, Will, and a few others escape in a rescue capsule, where they are all put into a state of suspended animation.

After the capsule crashes on an unknown planet, Druuna awakens alone. She is soon caught in a war between two alien species, one of which is composed of parasitic beings who need organic specimens as hosts, and the other of intelligent robots pursuing the objective of creating organic life. Apparently, the planet is Earth thousands of years after a war between men and machines resulted in the extinction of the former. The machines want to recreate their creators to try to understand humanity. Will briefly reappears and is kidnapped. Shastar also reappears, now working with the machines in their aim to recover the human species. Toward that aim, they decide to clone Druuna.

In Came From The Wind (2018) Druuna (in fact, Druuna's clone) finds herself, without memory, in what seems a new world or dimension filled with fields and occupied by Native Americans and the first European settlers, only to find out that not only does man's cruelty reign there, but a form of the "sickness" also seems to be present.

Style and content 

The original Morbus Gravis cover (as seen, for example here: https://images-na.ssl-images-amazon.com/images/I/510UyHUFzxL._SY291_BO1,204,203,200_QL40_FMwebp_.jpg) is the perfect synthesis of the visual style of the entire Druuna saga: a ravishing woman in extremely scant clothing and a man turning into a monster, with a decaying urban setting on the background.

The Morbus Gravis series is noteworthy for featuring explicit content in terms of both graphic violence and sex. Volume 3, Creatura, in fact, features near-totally explicit sexual penetration, and the three subsequent books feature totally uncensored penetration. The Heavy Metal reprints differ from the stand-alones by having censored hardcore portions via oversize speech/thought balloons. In vol. 5, Mandragora, several pages were simply excised. The series returned to a non-explicit depiction of penetration in such scenes with vol. 7, The Forgotten Planet. Came From The Wind (2018) tones down the sexual aspect of the story—it is merely erotic now, with Druuna's wandering around naked or in a thong for the first half of the adventure. No sexual acts are depicted in this album (but are referred to). This album seems to have been the last one penned by Serpieri and, as usual, has an open ending (Druuna opts to keep going on her endless journey).

A new album, Druuna: Au Commencement - Première Partie, Espoirs (2022), is a remake/prequel/spinoff of the original Morbus Gravis story arc, but from different authors with a different graphical style and once again depicting very hardcore scenes. Druuna's personality seems a bit different, since this version of her does try to fend off unwanted sexual assaults and also has a bit more modesty; more in line with how a "regular" emancipated woman from the XXI might act, not simply being a mere pawn.

Character 
In most cases, Druuna's role is that of a willing sexual object, submitting to sexual advances of all kinds with little or no complaint, other than the occasional sad pout, though she has been raped on more than one occasion in the series. Serpieri claims that the character's approach to sexual pleasures is a challenge to Judeo-Christian mores on sexuality.

Druuna is usually depicted as a character that does not have much agency, basically being dragged around by other characters or going where someone says she should go, but even in the first Album (Morbus Gravis) - she clearly does anything she has to do in order to stay alive or help her loved one (even  performing or being subjected to unwanted sexual acts), and she is also cunning (she lures her attackers to their ultimate demise) and a good soul that does not want to see anyone die (even if that person tried to harm her) and goes to great lengths to carry out her loved one's last request.  In Carnivora Druuna shows how well she can keep her cool under extreme pressure, and how resourceful she is, by learning, instantly, how to operate and aim a flame thrower (something that she apparently has never seen before), saving a stranger. She is extremely intelligent and quickly grasps the paradoxes of time traveling through different universes. She's also strong willed- she keeps going, even after being fatally wounded.

In the album Druuna X, Serpieri states that he styled Druuna as influenced by Valérie Kaprisky's appearance in the film La Femme publique, but because of the influence of the copious Western comics he had drawn at that point, in the first few pages of Morbus Gravis Druuna appeared to exhibit Native American facial features, compared to the later appearance to which she evolved.

List of appearances 
 Morbus Gravis
 Morbus Gravis (Dargaud, 1985)  - reprinted in Heavy Metal Magazine Vol. 10, #2 Summer 1986
 Druuna (Dargaud, 1987)  - reprinted in Heavy Metal Magazine Vol. 12, #1 Spring 1988
 Creatura (Bagheera, 1990)  -  reprinted in Heavy Metal Magazine Vol. 16, #4 (magazine lists it as Vol. 17, #4) Nov. 1992
 Carnivora (Bagheera, 1992)  - reprinted in Heavy Metal: Software Special Edition Vol. 7, #2, 1993.
 Mandragora (Bagheera, 1995)  - reprinted in Heavy Metal Magazine Vol. 19, #4 Sept. 1995
 Aphrodisia (Bagheera, 1997)  - reprinted in Heavy Metal Magazine Vol. 21, #4 Sept. 1997
 La Planète oubliée (The Forgotten Planet) (Bagheera, 2000)  - reprinted in Heavy Metal Magazine Vol. 25, #2 May 2001
 Clone (Bagheera, 2003)  -  reprinted in Heavy Metal Magazine Vol. 27, #5 Nov. 2003
 Anima: Les Origines  (Glénat BD, 2016) 
 Venuta Dal Vento (Came From The Wind) (Lo Scarabeo, 2018) 
 Druuna – Au commencement. Première partie – Espoirs (2022)
 Serpieri sketchbooks
 Serpieri Obsession: In Search of Druuna (Heavy Metal Magazine, 1993) 
 Druuna X (Heavy Metal Magazine, Dec. 1993) 
 Druuna X 2 (Heavy Metal Magazine, 1998) 
 Serpieri: The Sweet Smell of Woman (Heavy Metal Magazine, 2000) 
 Croquis (Serpieri Sketchbook)(Bagheera, 2001)  - reprinted in Heavy Metal Magazine, 2001. 
 Serpieri Sketchbook 2 (Heavy Metal Magazine, 2002)

In other media 
The character has also appeared in the critically and commercially panned videogame tie-in Druuna: Morbus Gravis.

References

Bibliography
 Ralf Georg Czapla, Morbus Gravis (Druuna). In: Lexikon der Comics. Werke, Personen, Themen, Aspekte. Loseblattausgabe. Begründet von Heiko Langhans, fortgeführt von Marcus Czerwionka. Corian Verlag, Meitingen. 33. Ergänzungslieferung März 2000

External links
 Ecofeminist Themes in Serpieri's Morbus Gravis article at Interdisciplinary Comics Studies

Erotic comics
Comics characters introduced in 1985
Italian comics titles
Post-apocalyptic comics
Comics adapted into video games